Svetovidovia lucullus is a species of morid cod found in the polar regions of the northeastern Atlantic Ocean.

References
 

Moridae
Monotypic fish genera
Fish described in 1953